Agios Isidoros may refer to several places in Greece:
Agios Isidoros, Rhodes, a village on the island of Rhodes
Agios Isidoros, Lesbos, a village on the island of Lesbos
Agios Isidoros, Paphos, a village in Cyprus